Malagasia is a monotypic genus of trees in the family Proteaceae. The sole species is Malagasia alticola, endemic to Madagascar.

The species was originally described in 1963 by French botanist René Capuron. Capuron included the new species in the genus Macadamia, naming it Macadamia alticola. The species was transferred to the newly erected genus Malagasia in 1975 by Barbara Briggs and Lawrie Johnson.

References

Proteaceae
Monotypic Proteaceae genera
Endemic flora of Madagascar
Taxa named by Barbara G. Briggs
Taxa named by Lawrence Alexander Sidney Johnson